The Rolling Stones' 1964 2nd American Tour was a concert tour by the band. The tour commenced on October 24 and concluded on November 15, 1964. On this tour, the band supported their album 12 X 5.

The Rolling Stones 
 Mick Jagger - lead vocals, percussion, harmonica
 Keith Richards - guitar, backing vocals
 Brian Jones - guitar, harmonica, backing vocals
 Bill Wyman - bass guitar, backing vocals
 Charlie Watts - drums

Tour set list
"Not Fade Away"
"Walking The Dog"
"If You Need Me"
"Carol"
"Time Is On My Side"
"Around and Around
"Tell Me"
"It's All Over Now"
"Hi-Heel Sneakers"
"You Can Make It If You Try"
"I'm A King Bee"
"I'm Alright"

Tour dates 
 24/10/1964 New York City, New York, Academy of Music (2 shows)
 26/10/1964 Sacramento, California, Memorial Auditorium
 31/10/1964 San Bernardino, California, Swing Auditorium
 01/11/1964 Long Beach, California, Civic Auditorium
 01/11/1964 San Diego, California, Balboa Park Bowl
 03/11/1964 Cleveland, Ohio, Public Hall
 04/11/1964 Providence, Rhode Island, Loews Theater
 11/11/1964 Milwaukee, Wisconsin, Auditorium (without Brian Jones)
 12/11/1964 Fort Wayne, Indiana, War Memorial Coliseum (without Brian Jones)
 13/11/1964 Dayton, Ohio, Wampler's Hara Arena (without Brian Jones)
 14/11/1964 Louisville, Kentucky, Memorial Auditorium (2 shows) (without Brian Jones)
 15/11/1964 Chicago, Illinois, Arie Crown Theatre

References 
 Carr, Roy.  The Rolling Stones: An Illustrated Record.  Harmony Books, 1976.  

The Rolling Stones concert tours
1964 concert tours
1964 in American music
Concert tours of the United States